The Queensland Rugby Union had collapsed in 1919 and would not be reborn until 1929 leaving the New South Wales Rugby Union to administer the game in Australia at the national representative level. In 1923 the New South Wales side toured New Zealand
In 1986 the Australian Rugby Union decreed the five full-internationals played on the tour as official Test matches.

Previously the All Blacks visited New South Wales in the 1920 tour. 

This tour happened while the Springboks were completing their tour in New Zealand. Previously in June, South Africa played three match (unofficial match for the South African Rugby Board.)

Matches 
Scores and results list New South Wales' points tally first.

References

The Sydney Morning Herald Thursday 11 August 1921 p 7
Barrier Miner (Broken Hill) Monday 15 August 1921 p 1
The Sydney Morning Herald Tuesday 16 August 1921 p 12
The Register (Adelaide) Friday 19 August 1921 p 7
The Sydney Morning Herald Monday 22 August 1921 p 6
The Register (Adelaide) Thursday 25 August 1921 p 8
The Sydney Morning Herald Monday 29 August 1921 p 5
The Advertiser (Adelaide) Monday 5 September 1921 p 10
The Register (Adelaide) Thursday 8 September 1921 p 8

Notes 

Waratahs
Australia national rugby union team tours of New Zealand
New South Wales rugby union team tours
Tour